Gonzalo Asis (born 28 March 1996) is an Argentine professional footballer who plays as a right-back for Independiente.

Career
Asis was promoted into the first-team of Primera División side Independiente in 2017. He was an unused substitute for both legs of a 2017 Copa Sudamericana second stage victory against Deportes Iquique, prior to making his professional debut on 25 November in a league win away to Racing Club. After five total appearances for Independiente, Asis spent the 2019–20 campaign out on loan in Primera B Nacional with Temperley. Nineteen appearances followed.

Career statistics
.

References

External links

1996 births
Living people
People from Lomas de Zamora
Argentine footballers
Association football defenders
Argentine Primera División players
Primera Nacional players
Club Atlético Independiente footballers
Club Atlético Temperley footballers
Sportspeople from Buenos Aires Province